Mińsk Mazowiecki ( "Masovian Minsk") is a town in eastern Poland with 40,999 inhabitants (2020). It is situated in the Masovian Voivodeship (since 1999) and is a part of the Warsaw Agglomeration. It is the capital of Mińsk County. Located 20 kilometers from the city limits of Warsaw and 38 kilometers from Warsaw's center.

Name
The source of town name - Mińsk - is the Mienia River, which in turn derives from the verb 'mienić', which means 'to shine'. The postnominal adjective 'Mazowiecki''' shows the historical connection to Mazovia and distinguishes Mińsk Mazowiecki from the Belarusian capital of Minsk.

Location

Timeline of history
XIV century – first mentions of a settlement with commercial function
1421, 29 May – Mińsk was granted town privileges by Janusz I of Warsaw
1422 – first wooden church was built (not preserved)
1549 – a second town Sendomierz, later merged with Mińsk, was located on the other side of Srebrna River
1629 – the present church opened
1695 – Sendomierz joined to Mińsk
XVIII century – gradual decline of Mińsk connected with gradual decline of the Polish–Lithuanian Commonwealth
1795–1809 – under Austrian rule as a result of the Third Partition of Poland
1809–1815 – in the Duchy of Warsaw
1815–1916 – in the Congress Poland
1866 – Mińsk county established, first train arrival (Warsaw–Terespol Railway)
1867 – name of the town changed to Nowomińsk (Novominsk)
1870 – Dernałowicz Family became the last owners of the city (up to the Second World War)
1886 – first bookstore in east Mazovia
XX century – found of famous manufacture
1912 (or 1910) – start of Maria Grochowska's School, today this is Polska Macierz Szkolna's High School
1914 – old church opened after reconstruction
1915 – present hospital opened
1915 to 1918, 11 November – German occupation during World War I
1916 – name's change (Novominsk > Mińsk Mazowiecki)
1920 – briefly occupied by Russians before the Battle of Warsaw during the Polish-Bolshevik War
1920–1939 – great development
1937 – first electric train arrived
1939–1944 – second German occupation (World War II)
1939, 12 September – German entry
1939, 13 September – battle for Mińsk Mazowiecki (led by gen. Władysław Anders)
1942, 21 July – liquidation of Mińsk Mazowiecki ghetto. Most of the Jewish residents were murdered at the Treblinka death camp (one of the first episodes of The Holocaust)
1944, 30 July – liberation by Armia Krajowa (prelude to Warsaw Uprising)
1944, 30–31 July – Soviet liberation
1945, 2–3 March – Soviet killed Mińsk's elite (with Mayor Hipolit Konopka)
1952 – trains manufacture
1957 – military garrison
1979 – new train station
1985 – Solidarity events
1990 – first Mayor elected in free elections (since elections before Second World War): Zbigniew Grzesiak
1999 – Mińsk County established

Jewish history

In 1768, the restrictions on permanent residence for Jewish people in Mińsk had been lifted. From the 19th century to the 1930s, it became very popular. Before the Second World War, there were thousands of Jews living in Mińsk, and they had a general synagogue and smaller temples. The Novominsk hasidic dynasty was founded here in the late 19th century by Rabbi Yaakov Perlow, a descendant of the Baal Shem Tov.

Soon after the war began, the Germans created the Mińsk Ghetto. It was liquidated on 21 July 1942. Most of the Jews were murdered in Treblinka extermination camp sent in Holocaust trains by the thousands. The remaining Jewish population were murdered in Mińsk on 10 January 1943 (500 people) and 5 June (the last 150 people).

Monuments

layout of medieval settlement and later city
Palace of Doria Dernałowicz Family – built probably in the 17th century (in place of 16th century residence), converted to classicism
park
Church of the Nativity of The Blessed Virgin Mary – built in the 17th century, converted to neo-baroque in the early 20th century
internal furnishing
cemetery
county hall (former), 19th century, classicism
county hall, 19th century
post office, 19th century, empire
church of Mariavite Church, 1911
residential areas, 19th and early 20th century
Jewish cemetery
some school buildings (early 20th century)

Economy

Trade:
hypermarket Carrefour
supermarkets (about 10)
many other shops
market
developers

Service:
10 banks
fast-foods, pubs and restaurants
3 hotels
construction industry
car service
satellite communication

Industry:
 ZNTK "Mińsk Mazowiecki" (since 2008 a subsidiary PESA SA) –  maintenance and repair of railway rolling stock
 Fabryka Urządzeń Dźwigowych – production of cranes and other heavy machinery
 cotton products
 yachts
 shoes
 foil

 Population 

EducationJózef Majka College of Social Science (catholic)Stanisław Staszic Lifelong Learning Center
University of Third AgePolska Macierz Szkolna Gymnasium and High School
Salesian Elementary, Gymnasium and High School (catholic)Kazimierz Wielki Professional High SchoolPowstańcy Warszawy Professional High School
High School of EconomyMaria Skłodowska-Curie High School
3 public gymnasiums
4 public elementary schools
over 10 preschools (6 public)
special school (for kids with problems)
clinic of psychological and pedagogical help

Bureaus

Regional Bureau of Environmental Protection Inspection
Point of Conscription
Above Forester Bureau (Nadleśnictwo Mińsk)
County, city and commune bureaus

Safety
Police Departament of Mińsk County – 2 building in Mińsk, dozens of cars (including sport cars and off-road cars)
Fire Departament of Mińsk County – quite new fire engines (well equipped after big fire in industry area a few years ago)
Public Hospital of Mińsk County

Culture and sports

Culture:
House of Culture
School of Art
2 libraries
2 museums
Cinema
Magazines (2 public and 3 commercial are published in Mińsk)

Sport:
Miejski Ośrodek Sportu i Rekreacji (public sport and recreation departament)
2 stadiums
Ice rink
Other
Mazovia-ZNTK
Football team in local amateur league
Other sports
other clubs

Religions

Roman Catholic Church (4 parishes and other structures)
Mariavite Church (1 parish)
Baptist (1 congregation)
Mennonite (1 congregation)

Public transport
Train station
Regular service (39 trains in one way daily) to Warsaw
Direct connections with many cities in Poland, and with Moscow
2 regular bus services to Warsaw

Lands
Overall: 
Residential: 30%
Industrial: 6%
Communication (roads, railroads etc.): 15%
Agricultural: 29%
Parks: 5%
Other: 15%

Historical parts of city

Cities:
Mińsk – old town
Sendomierz (found 1549, joined 1695)

Estates built as part of Mińsk:
 – New Town – Garden Town (found 1936)
Concrete estates built in socialist realism (about 1945–1990) without names
Modern estates without names

Villages:
Over railroad part of city (all existed in 1839 and earlier)
Kędzierak (joined partly in 1954 and fully in 1984)
Stankowizna (joined in 19th or 20th century)
Anielina (joined in similar time as Kędzierak)
Other
Górki (joined in the 18th century)
Goździk (joined during First War War)
Kolonia Stasinów (joined in 1936)
Pohulanka (joined partly in 1936)
Sewerynów (joined in similar time as Kędzierak)

Military
Military police
23rd Air Base with MIG-29 aircraft

Twin towns – sister cities

Mińsk Mazowiecki is twinned with:

 Borodianka, Ukraine
 Krnov, Czech Republic
 Lacey, United States
 Pefki, Greece
 Saint-Égrève, France
 Telšiai, Lithuania

Notable people
Julian Grobelny, Righteous Among the Nations
Louis B. Mayer, Hollywood film producer and studio executive
Czesław Mroczek, poseł
Teresa Wargocka, poseł
Moshe Carmel, politician in Israel
Stefan Żeromski, writer
Jan Himilsbach, actor and author
Leyb Rokhman, Yiddish writer in Israel
Hanna Dunowska, actor
Victor Prus, architect in Canada
Yeshurun Keshet Israeli poet, essayist, translator and literary critic
Jacques Kalisz, architect in France
Stanislav Redens, secret police officer in the Soviet Union
Hermann Birnbach, subject of a Stolperstein'' in Nordhausen
Marek Piotrowski, World Champion in Kickboxing
Rafał Jackiewicz, boxer

References

Books
585 lat Mińska Mazowieckiego, red. Janusz Kuligowski, Mińsk Mazowiecki, 2006,

External links 
 Co słychać? – weekly magazine, ISSN 1425-6185
 Web page of City Hall Minsk Maz.pl (English)
 Web page of County Hall Powiat Minski.pl
 Web page: virtual tour. Panoramas.
 Jewish cemetery
 Jewish cemetery
 Historical placards
 

Cities and towns in Masovian Voivodeship
Mińsk County
Masovian Voivodeship (1526–1795)
Warsaw Governorate
Warsaw Voivodeship (1919–1939)
Holocaust locations in Poland